Tasa Konević Apostolović (d. 1916) was an Orthodox priest and Macedonian Serb Chetnik from Krapa in Poreče. He was the son of a local Serb chief, Kone Apostolović, who was the leader of the Prilep Serbs at the end of the 19th century, and one of the richest in the village. Priest Tasa was the protector of Serbdom in Poreče and led the local guerrilla organization. He participated in the Ilinden Uprising (July–August 1903), orchestrated by the Bulgarian-organized Internal Macedonian Revolutionary Organization (IMRO), with a Serb band. After the Kokošinje slaughters (July–October 1904) and IMRO attacks on Macedonian Serbs, he organized the village self-defense units and joined Gligor Sokolović and his neighbour Trenko Rujanović, of the Serbian Chetnik Organization. Tasa defended and administrated the village throughout the Macedonian Struggle. An important event was the attack on Krapa by combined bands of the IMRO, which ended in a fight on Kurt's Stone won by the Serbian bands. Tasa was murdered in 1916, in the Derviš fields massacre when the occupying Bulgarian Army executed 104 Serb leaders from Poreče.

Annotations

See also
 List of Chetnik voivodes

References

Sources

20th-century Serbian people
1916 deaths
Serbian rebels
Serbian Orthodox clergy
Executed Serbian people
Executed Macedonian people
20th-century executions by Bulgaria
People executed by military occupation forces
1872 births
People from Makedonski Brod Municipality
Chetniks of the Macedonian Struggle
Serbian military personnel of the Balkan Wars
Serbian military personnel of World War I
Serbian military personnel killed in World War I
Armed priests
Executed revolutionaries
Serbs of North Macedonia